Paul Hammond may refer to:

 Paul Hammond (footballer) (born 1953), British football player
 Paul Hammond (ballet dancer) (1922–2010), Australian dancer
 Paul Hammond (musician) (1952–1992), English rock drummer
 Paul Y. Hammond (1929–2012), American foreign policy scholar